Sala Vaimili Uili II is a Samoan politician and former Cabinet Minister.

Vaimili was first elected to the Legislative Assembly of Samoa in the 1991 Western Samoan general election. He served as Minister of Health from 1991 to 1996. He lost his seat at the 1996 election. He unsuccessfully ran for election again in 2001 and 2006. He ran as a candidate for the Tautua Samoa Party at the 2011 election.

In May 2016 he was banished from the village of Leauva’a alongside two election candidates after supporting an election petition against incumbent MP Sala Fata Pinati.

He contested the 2021 election as a candidate for the F.A.S.T. Party, but was not elected. In August 2022 he was appointed to the board of the Samoa Ports Authority.

References

Living people
Members of the Legislative Assembly of Samoa
Government ministers of Samoa
Health ministers of Samoa
Human Rights Protection Party politicians
Tautua Samoa Party politicians
Faʻatuatua i le Atua Samoa ua Tasi politicians
Year of birth missing (living people)